Borkowo megalithic cemetery is a prehistoric burial ground situated in the county of Sławno, in Western Pomerania, Poland.

The site consists of a passage grave, unchambered long barrows, and other tumuli. The most impressive monument, Borkowo 1, is a passage grave made with heavy boulders and capstones. It is around 4.5 metres long, with a width of 1.5 metres. Excavations revealed a cremation and a few pottery sherds. The grave is assigned to the Funnelbeaker culture of the Chalcolithic Age.

References

External links

Funnelbeaker culture
Prehistoric sites in Poland
Dolmens
Sławno County